Soon Ho Lee is the Grand Master Emeritus of Songahm Taekwondo, the American Taekwondo Association. He was given the title at ATA's World Championships in June 2002, succeeding his brother Haeng Ung Lee.

In 1969, Soon Ho Lee joined his elder brother in the United States.  His goal was to expand his academic opportunities, at the time he did not intend to become a Taekwondo instructor. In June 2011, at the world championships in Little Rock, Arkansas, he gave up his title of grand master, and In Ho Lee became the new grand master.

References 

Living people
Year of birth missing (living people)
American male taekwondo practitioners
South Korean emigrants to the United States